Fung Ka Wai is a village in Wang Chau, Yuen Long District, Hong Kong.

Administration
Fung Ka Wai is a recognized village under the New Territories Small House Policy. It is one of the 37 villages represented within the Ping Shan Rural Committee. For electoral purposes, Fung Ka Wai is part of the Ping Shan Central constituency.

History
Fung Ka Wai has historically been mainly occupied by members of the Fung family. The Fungs came from Huizhou in Guangdong province. They first settled in the village of Tong Fong Tsuen in the Ping Shan area, where they worked for the Tang Clan as farmers. They then moved to the present area which was previously called Kok Tsz Tau and  established  their  own village in 1895 (or 1912) after having some savings. They started with mat-sheds and later built their houses with green bricks and mud bricks.

In 1985, the village was described as small, consisting of three rows of houses facing southwest and linked by lower structures to form an enclosed rectangle.

References

External links
 Delineation of area of existing village Fung Ka Wai (Ping Shan) for election of resident representative (2019 to 2022)

Villages in Yuen Long District, Hong Kong
Wang Chau (Yuen Long)